Mexico is a historical unincorporated community, in Hunt County, Texas, now inundated by Lake Tawakoni.

References

Unincorporated communities in Texas
Unincorporated communities in Hunt County, Texas